Seals is an English surname of Cornish origin. The Seals family lived in the parish of Seal which had holdings in the English counties of Northumberland, Leicester, Surrey and Kent.

List of people with surname Seals 
AJ Seals (born 2000), American soccer player
Baby Franklin Seals (c. 1880 – 1915), American vaudeville performer and songwriter
Brady Seals (born 1969), American country music artist
Brian Kennedy Seals (born 1983), American songwriter, record producer, composer and musician
Bruce Seals (1953–2020), American basketball player
Dan Seals (1948–2009), American musician
Dan Seals (Illinois politician) (born 1971), American politician
Darren Seals (1987–2016), American activist from Ferguson, Missouri
David Seals (born 1947), American poet
Franklyn Seales (1952–1990), American actor
George Seals (born 1942), American football player
Jay Seals (born 1976), American actor
Jim Seals (1942–2022), American musician, one half of the duo Seals and Crofts
Leon Seals (born 1964), American football player
Melvin Seals (fl. 1980s), American musician, with rock band JGB
Ray Seals (born 1965), American footballer
Ricky Seals-Jones (born 1995), American football tight end
Shea Seals (born 1975), American basketball player
Son Seals (1942–2004), American blues guitarist and singer
Sugar Ray Seales (born 1952), American boxer
Troy Seals (born 1938), American singer
Venetta Seals, American politician and businesswoman, Mayor of Pecos, Texas
Warren Seals (born 1992), South African rugby union player
Woodrow Bradley Seals (1917–1990), United States District Judge in Texas

See also
Seals (disambiguation)

References

English-language surnames
Surnames
Surnames of English origin